John Warren Davis (March 4, 1867 – February 21, 1945) was a United States circuit judge of the United States Court of Appeals for the Third Circuit and previously was a United States district judge of the United States District Court for the District of New Jersey.

Education and career

Born on March 4, 1867, in Elizabeth City, North Carolina, Davis received a Bachelor of Arts degree in 1896 from Bucknell University, a Bachelor of Divinity in 1899 from Crozer Theological Seminary and a Bachelor of Laws in 1906 from University of Pennsylvania Law School. Subsequent to his graduation from Crozer Theological Seminary, Davis taught Hebrew and Greek at that institution for three years. After leaving Crozer, Davis traveled, briefly studying at the University of Chicago and the University of Leipzig in the German Empire, before returning to attend the University of Pennsylvania Law School. He entered private practice in Philadelphia, Pennsylvania, and Camden, New Jersey from 1907 to 1911. He was elected as a Democrat as  a member of the New Jersey Senate, serving from 1911 to 1913. He was the United States Attorney for the District of New Jersey from 1913 to 1916.

Federal judicial service

Davis was nominated by President Woodrow Wilson on May 6, 1916, to the United States District Court for the District of New Jersey, to a new seat authorized by 39 Stat. 48. He was confirmed by the United States Senate on May 15, 1916, and received his commission the same day. His service terminated on June 12, 1920, due to his elevation to the Third Circuit.

Davis was nominated by President Wilson on May 28, 1920, to a seat on the United States Court of Appeals for the Third Circuit vacated by Judge Thomas Griffith Haight. He was confirmed by the Senate on June 2, 1920, and received his commission the same day. He was a member of the Conference of Senior Circuit Judges (now the Judicial Conference of the United States) in 1938. He assumed senior status on April 15, 1939, in response to the Fox scandal, and was inactive during his entire period of senior service. His service terminated on November 24, 1941, due to his resignation, thus relinquishing his lifetime salary to which he would otherwise have been entitled.

Scandal, indictment and resignation

In March 1939, Davis was indicted by a federal grand jury on charges of conspiracy to obstruct justice and defraud the United States, stemming from an allegation that he was bribed by the famous film producer William Fox. Fox pleaded guilty on March 28, 1939, prompting Davis to step down from the bench two weeks thereafter. Davis and a co-conspirator were tried twice by United States Attorney Francis Biddle, each trial resulting in a hung jury.

Later career and death

In the late 1930s, Davis served as the Chairman of the Board of Trustees of his alma mater Bucknell; in addition the Davis Gymnasium was named in his honour. During his final years, Davis resided on his farm in Princess Anne County, Virginia. Davis died on February 21, 1945.

Personal

Davis married Marguerite Noble Gay on June 14, 1913, just two days after receiving his commission as United States Attorney. He was survived by two sons. Davis was predeceased by his daughter, who died in childbirth in 1943.

References

Sources
 

1867 births
1945 deaths
20th-century American judges
20th-century American politicians
Bucknell University alumni
Crozer Theological Seminary alumni
Judges of the United States Court of Appeals for the Third Circuit
Judges of the United States District Court for the District of New Jersey
Leipzig University alumni
New Jersey lawyers
Democratic Party New Jersey state senators
Pennsylvania lawyers
People from Elizabeth City, North Carolina
Politicians from Salem County, New Jersey
United States Attorneys for the District of New Jersey
United States court of appeals judges appointed by Woodrow Wilson
United States district court judges appointed by Woodrow Wilson
University of Chicago alumni
University of Pennsylvania Law School alumni